The Embassy of the State of Palestine in the Democratic People's Republic of Korea is the diplomatic mission of Palestine in North Korea. It is located in Munsudong, Taedonggang District, Pyongyang.

See also

List of diplomatic missions in North Korea.
List of diplomatic missions of Palestine.

References

Pyongyang
Palestine